Lofthouse of Fleetwood Ltd. is a British family-owned company based in Fleetwood on the Lancashire coast. It was headed by Tony Lofthouse until his death in 2018; he was the fourth generation of the Lofthouse family to head the company. The company's most famous product is the Fisherman's Friend menthol lozenge.

Two-thirds of the company's shares were held by Doreen and Tony Lofthouse, and the remaining third by a family foundation and Doreen’s son Duncan Lofthouse.  Doreen died in 2021, at the age of 91.

References

External links 
 
 

Food and drink companies of the United Kingdom
Companies based in Lancashire
Fleetwood
Companies established in 1865